Countess Anna Alekseyevna Orlova-Chesmenskaya (1785–1848), was a Russian Empire landowner, and courtier. She was known for her work against the serfdom in Russia. Also known for her piety, she acquired a saintly reputation.

Anna was the daughter of count Alexei Orlov and Eudoxia Lopukhina, who died in 1786 after giving birth to Anna's brother, Ivan. Ivan did not survive infancy (1786-1787). As the only surviving child, Anna was heir to enormous estates in Karelia and a fortune of millions, all of which she inherited after the death of her father in 1808. Anna was introduced to Saint Petersburg aristocratic society by her father, but never married. She was appointed maid of honor to the empress in 1817, which was not an honorary position but a profession which tasks she fulfilled, such as accompanying the empress on journeys.

After the death of her father in 1808, she took control of her land and fortune, and became famed for her piety and work for the Orthodox church. Under the influence of young monk Archimandrite Photius from the Yuriev Monastery, she made pilgrimages and made large donations to Orthodox convents and churches. During Orlova's lifetime, "Photius and his colleagues milked her for twenty-five million rubles, $740 mln in today's money and five per cent of the Russian crown's entire annual revenue as of 1833".

Countess Orlova and her confessor Photius were buried in the Yuriev Monastery, in the Church of the Transfiguration which they had built. A well-known epigram by Alexander Pushkin implies they were lovers:

References

 kansallisbiografia (Finlands nationalbiografi)
 

Countesses of the Russian Empire
Philanthropists from the Russian Empire
1785 births
1848 deaths
Ladies-in-waiting from the Russian Empire
19th-century philanthropists
19th-century landowners